This article lists important figures and events in Malaysian public affairs during the year 1991, together with births and deaths of notable Malaysians.

Incumbent political figures

Federal level
Yang di-Pertuan Agong: Sultan Azlan Shah
Raja Permaisuri Agong: Tuanku Bainun
Prime Minister: Dato' Sri Dr Mahathir Mohamad
Deputy Prime Minister: Dato' Ghafar Baba
Lord President: Abdul Hamid Omar

State level
 Sultan of Johor: Sultan Iskandar
 Sultan of Kedah: Sultan Abdul Halim Muadzam Shah
 Sultan of Kelantan: Sultan Ismail Petra
 Raja of Perlis: Tuanku Syed Putra
 Sultan of Perak: Raja Nazrin Shah (Regent)
 Sultan of Pahang: Sultan Ahmad Shah
 Sultan of Selangor: Sultan Salahuddin Abdul Aziz Shah
 Sultan of Terengganu: Sultan Mahmud Al-Muktafi Billah Shah
 Yang di-Pertuan Besar of Negeri Sembilan: Tuanku Jaafar (Deputy Yang di-Pertuan Agong)
 Yang di-Pertua Negeri (Governor) of Penang: Tun Dr Hamdan Sheikh Tahir
 Yang di-Pertua Negeri (Governor) of Malacca: Tun Syed Ahmad Al-Haj bin Syed Mahmud Shahabuddin
 Yang di-Pertua Negeri (Governor) of Sarawak: Tun Ahmad Zaidi Adruce Mohammed Noor
 Yang di-Pertua Negeri (Governor) of Sabah: Tun Said Keruak

Events
January – Keretapi Tanah Melayu (Malayan Railway) was incorporated as Keretapi Tanah Melayu Berhad (KTMB). 
February – UMNO party was brought it to state of Sabah by Deputy Prime Minister Tun Ghafar Baba.
February – 1991 Malacca water crisis.
6 February – 1991 Selangor water crisis.
March – The 1991 Malaysian haze affected Kuala Lumpur and Klang Valley.
7 March – The first Malaysian boat show opened in Port Klang, Selangor
7 May – The Bright Sparklers Fireworks Factory at Sungai Buloh, Selangor caught fire and caused a huge explosion that killed 29 and injured 83 people. It was Malaysia's worst industrial disaster to date.
June – The New Economic Development Programme was launched.
June – TV host for the Kelab Kanak-Kanak Angkasapuri, Intan Yusniza Mohd Yunus and her mother were murdered. 
1 August – The Lot 10 Kuala Lumpur shopping complex officially opened. 
August – The Vision 2020 (Wawasan 2020) programme was launched.
27–29 September – The first Malaysian motorcycle Grand Prix in Batu Tiga Circuit, Shah Alam, Selangor.
October – The piling works for Kuala Lumpur Tower were completed.

Births
 21 January – Mohd Fadhli Mohd Shas – Malaysian defender
 8 February – Syatilla Melvin – Actress and model
 1 March – Misbun Ramdan Misbun – Badminton player
 24 May – Iskandar Zulkarnain Zainuddin – Badminton player
 9 September – Siti Adira Suhaimi – Singer
 20 September – Khairul Anuar Mohamad – Archer
 26 September – Mohd Fakhrurazi Musa – Footballer
 20 October – Zulfahmi Khairuddin – Malaysian Grand Prix Motorcycle racer
 12 November – Mohd Syukur Saidin – Footballer
 14 November – Zubir Azmi – Footballer
 22 November – Diana Danielle – Actress

Deaths
11 July – Mokhtar Dahari – Malaysian footballer
6 September – Tan Sri Mohammad Noah – Politician and Minister of Home Affairs and Speaker of the Dewan Rakyat
7 November – Ishak Haji Muhammad (Pak Sako) – Malay author and nationalist

See also
 1991 
 1990 in Malaysia | 1992 in Malaysia
 History of Malaysia

 
Years of the 20th century in Malaysia
Malaysia
Malaysia
1990s in Malaysia